Hellinsia monteverda is a moth of the family Pterophoridae. It is found in Costa Rica.

References

Moths described in 1999
monteverda
Moths of Central America